The Liberty Bell installed outside the Oregon State Capitol's west entrance, in Salem, Oregon, is a replica of the Liberty Bell in Philadelphia, Pennsylvania. The bell was presented to Oregon on
July 4, 1950, by John Snyder, an American businessman and federal government official who served as United States Secretary of the Treasury in President Harry S. Truman's administration, to promote savings bonds.

See also

 1950 in art
 Liberty Bell (Portland, Oregon)

References

External links
 

1950 establishments in Oregon
1950 sculptures
Individual bells in the United States
Liberty symbols
Outdoor sculptures in Salem, Oregon